Metavari is an American electronic music project led by Nathaniel David Utesch in Fort Wayne, Indiana.

History 
From 2008-2012, Metavari released two EP's, one full-length, and showcased at the SXSW Music Festival in Austin, TX as a post-rock oriented full band. During this time the band shared the stage with many notable acts in the post-rock genre including This Will Destroy You, Maserati, Tortoise, The Appleseed Cast, Lymbyc Systym and other indie groups such as Bear In Heaven, Anamanaguchi and Titus Andronicus.

Metavari launched a Kickstarter in 2012 to fund the release of their sophomore full-length. The record was eventually materialized in 2015 with Nathaniel David Utesch as primary composer and producer, saw their departure from the post-rock genre, and was Metavari's debut as an electronic music project. The crowd-sourced LP is titled, Moonless, and was self-released February 2015.

Since 2015, Metavari has released two records with Mind Over Matter Records (Los Angeles); Oh Diane in September 2015; and Tetra A.D. in February 2017. "Oh Diane" is a tribute to the television series, Twin Peaks, and was featured on the compilation, The Next Peak, Vol III.

Metavari re-scored Fritz Lang’s Metropolis as a commission from Fort Wayne, Indiana’s Cinema Center for Art House Theater Day 2016. The re-score was released worldwide on One Way Static Records for Record Store Day 2017, and distributed in the United States by Light in the Attic Records. Two years later, Metavari released another official Record Store Day title with One Way Static/Light in the Attic. Titled, ABSURDA, the record was scored to a collection of work spanning the career of David Lynch and doubled as Metavari's fourth studio release.

Members
In addition to Nathaniel, live shows are often accompanied by the bassist from Metavari’s original line-up, Ty Brinneman.

List of past and present members and collaborators:
 Nathaniel David Utesch — synths, vocals, programming, alto saxophone, drums
 Ty Brinneman — bass guitar
 Tommy Cutter — guitar, programming
 Simon Lesser — guitar
 Andrew McComas — drums, guitar
 Kyle Steury — guitar, synths, programming
Colin Boyd — drums, percussion

Discography

Albums
 Be One of Us and Hear No Noise (2009, Crossroads of America Records)
 Be One of Us and Hear No Noise (Extended Edition) (2009, Friend of Mine Records)
 Moonless (2015, Vital Shores)
 Metropolis (An Original Re-Score by Metavari) (2017, One Way Static Records)
 Symmetri (2017, One Way Static Records)
ABSURDA (2019, One Way Static Records)

EPs
 Ambling EP (2008, Self-Released)
 Studies vol.1: Loosen the Bands (2010, Crossroads of America Records)
 Tetra A.D. (2017, Mind Over Matter Records)
Soft Continuum (2019, Vital Shores)

Singles
 "Heavy Love" (2014, Vital Shores)
 "See Again" (2014, Vital Shores)
 "Oh Diane" b/w "Josie's Lament (Mill Fire)" (2015, Mind Over Matter Records)
 "Indigo" (2016, Vital Shores)
 "Messages" (2017, One Way Static Records)
 "Witchhunt feat. Daniel Weyandt" (2017, One Way Static Records)
"The Alphabet" (2019, One Way Static Records)

External links
Official Site

References

American post-rock groups
Indie rock musical groups from Indiana
Electronic music groups from Indiana
Mind Over Matter Records artists